The 2019 FIBA Women's AmeriCup was held in San Juan, Puerto Rico from 22 to 29 September 2019.

The United States won their third title by defeating Canada in the final.

Venue

Qualification
 Host nation
 
 North America Subzone:
  (qualified automatically)
  (qualified automatically)
 Central America and Caribbean Subzone: 2018 Centrobasket Women
 
 
 
 South America Subzone: 2018 South American Basketball Championship for Women
  (Champion)

Draw
The draw was held on 23 July 2019 in San Juan, Puerto Rico.

Squads

Each team consisted of 12 players.

Preliminary round
All times are local (UTC−4).

Group A

Group B

Knockout stage

Bracket

Semifinals

Seventh place game

Fifth place game

Third place game

Final

Final standing

Statistics and awards

Statistical leaders

Points

Rebounds

Assists

Blocks

Steals

Awards
The MVP was announced on 30 September 2019.

References

External links
Official website

 
FIBA Women's AmeriCup
2019 in women's basketball
2018–19 in North American basketball
2018–19 in South American basketball
International women's basketball competitions hosted by Puerto Rico